Shenzhen Ferry Terminal may refer to:
 Fuyong Ferry Terminal
 Shenzhen Cruise Center (the current Shenzhen Ferry Terminal)
 Shekou Ferry Terminal (old)